A hundred is a geographic division formerly used in northern Germanic countries and related colonies, which historically was used to divide a larger region into smaller administrative divisions. The Scanian hundreds were Danish until the Treaty of Roskilde of 1658.

List

Subdivisions of Sweden
Hundreds of Sweden
Hundreds